Sylvan Grove may refer to:

Sylvan Grove, Indiana, an unincorporated community in Clark County
Sylvan Grove, Kansas, a city in Lincoln County
Sylvan Grove, Pennsylvania, an unincorporated community in Clearfield County